The 2011 Sudan Premier League was the 40th edition of the highest club level football competition in Sudan. Al-Merrikh SC took out the championship.

Standings

References
RSSSF.com

Sudan Premier League seasons
Sudan
Sudan
football